Osman Mendez (born September 20, 1991) is an American soccer player who currently plays for Dayton Dutch Lions in the USL Professional Division.

Career

College and amateur
Mendez started his college soccer career in 2010 at Phoenix College before transferring to Sterling College in Kansas in 2012.

Professional
Mendez signed his first professional contract on June 13, 2014 when he joined USL Pro club Dayton Dutch Lions.

References

External links
 Dayton Dutch Lions bio

1991 births
Living people
American soccer players
Dayton Dutch Lions players
Association football defenders
Soccer players from California
USL Championship players
Sterling Warriors